School of Armour and Mechanized Warfare, formerly established as the Armoured Corps Centre and School (19471956), The Armoured Corps School (19561969), The School of Armour (19691993), is a military school of the Pakistan Army specialized in providing training in military and armoured warfares. It is one of the six armoured regiments of the country established in line with the British Indian Army. It also provides training for officers, including Pakistan Armoured Corps and the Armoured Corps Centre and School in military administration.

History 
Established in 1947 in Nowshera Cantonment, the North-West Frontier Province (now Khyber Pakhtunkhwa), it is usually headed by a lieutenant general. It had a school wing before it was separated from the Centre on 10 June 1969. It is also attended by foreign trainees from 29 countries, including Bangladesh, Brunei, China, Egypt, Gambia, Ghana, Iraq, Indonesia, Jordan, Kenya, Lebanon, Malaysia, Myanmar, Libya, Maldives, Nigeria, Nepal, Palestine, Saudi Arabia, Sri Lanka, Syria, Turkey, Tanzania, Tajikistan, Turkmenistan, the UAE, Uganda, Zambia, and Zimbabwe.

References 

Military academies of Pakistan
Military education and training in Pakistan
Training formations of Pakistan Army